Ambodimanga is a rural municipality in Madagascar. It belongs to the district of Amparafaravola, region Alaotra-Mangoro. The population of the commune was 4,852 in 2018.

References

Elevationmap.net

Populated places in Alaotra-Mangoro